The 1922 County Championship was the 29th officially organised running of the County Championship. Yorkshire County Cricket Club won the championship title.

The minimum number of matches required to qualify for the championship was increased to eleven home and away.

Table
 Five points were awarded for a win.
 Two points were awarded for "winning" the first innings of a drawn match.
 Final placings were decided by calculating the percentage of possible points.

References

1922 in English cricket
County Championship seasons